Sithara S. (born 1972) is an Indian feminist writer in Malayalam from Kerala. In her short stories and novels she has highlighted women's issues, gender conflict and lesbian rights. In 2004 she won Sahitya Akademi Golden Jubilee Award for her contributions to Indian literature She is also a translator from Malayalam to English and vice versa.

Early life and education
Sithara was born and brought up in Kasaragod district of Kerala. She obtained her post-graduation degree in English Literature and Diploma in journalism from University of Calicut.  At an early age she was afflicted with life-threatening cancer disease. She attributes her firebrand literary style to her lifelong battle against cancer and social stigma.

Literary works
Sithara is one of the leading contemporary women writers from Kerala. She has written several best-selling books in Malayalam which include "Kathakal", "Idam", "Veshappakarcha" and "Ushnagrahangalude Sneham". She chiefly writes stories depicting oppression of women and sexuality in public places. Her stories capture the complexities of modern life from women's perspective and have an angry and defiant tone.

Sithara has also translated the works of Nobel Laureate Malala Yousafzai into Malayalam. Her short story “Fire” has been included in the English Literature syllabus of Kerala University.

Other contributions
Sithara's short story Agni has been made into a popular movie. She is also a freelance content writer on children's topics for television.

Awards and recognition
Sithara's works were recognised by Sahitya Akademi which conferred on her its golden jubilee prize in 2004. She has also won Kerala Sahitya Akademi award. Besides he has won numerous other literary awards including ‘’Katha Award’’ and ‘’Geetha Hiranyan Endowment Award’’ for Malayalam literature.

Bibliography

Books in English

Books in Malayalam

Chapters in books

Journal articles

Translations
Enteyum Katha (2021), DC Books (Translation of  We Are Displaced by Malala Yousafzai)

See also
 Sahitya Akademi Award
 Kerala Sahitya Academy Award
 Malayalam literature
 Tapan Kumar Pradhan
 Mandakranta Sen

References

External links
Interview with Abdul Rasheed – Times of India dated 17 October 2019

Malayalam-language writers
Indian women writers
Living people
1972 births
Writers from Kerala
People from Kasaragod district
Malayali people
Recipients of the Sahitya Akademi Award in Malayalam
University of Calicut
University of Calicut alumni
Indian feminists
Feminist writers
Recipients of the Sahitya Akademi Golden Jubilee Award